Moïse Emmanuel Mbende (born 3 March 1996) is a Cameroonian footballer who plays as a centre back for Italian Serie C club Monterosi Tuscia.

He began his football career in the youth system of Borussia Dortmund before spending the 2015–16 season with English Championship (second-tier) club Birmingham City, but played no first-team football for either. He then returned to Germany, where he spent two years with 3. Liga club Chemnitzer FC before signing for SC Cambuur of the Dutch Eerste Divisie. A year later, he moved on to Catania, joined Viterbese in 2020, and then signed for Monterosi Tuscia in 2021. In international football, Mbende has represented his native Cameroon at under-20 level.

Club career
Mbende was born in Douala, Cameroon, and came to Germany in 2006. The family settled in Bochum, where he began his football career with SC Weitmar 45. He was spotted by Borussia Dortmund and recruited into their youth system at the under-13 level. He went on to play for two seasons in the UEFA Youth League, but left the club at the end of the 2014–15 season.

After trials in the Netherlands with Eredivisie club PEC Zwolle and MVV Maastricht of the Eerste Divisie, and in England with Football League Championship clubs Derby County, and Birmingham City, Mbende signed for the latter club in September 2015 until the end of the season. He was a regular member of Birmingham's under-21 team playing in the Professional Development League, and was a member of the Birmingham reserve team that lost the 2016 Birmingham Senior Cup final to National League North champions Solihull Moors, but did not break through to the first team.

He was offered a one-year contract, with an option for another year, in April 2016, and manager Gary Rowett expected him either to challenge the existing first-team centre-backs or to go out on loan to a lower-division club. However, he turned down the contract offer, preferring to return to Germany to study and to play for 3. Liga club Chemnitzer FC, with whom he signed a two-year deal; Birmingham included a "significant" sell-on clause in the deal.

Mbende began his Chemnitz career on the bench, but made his senior debut in their fourth match of the 2016–17 3. Liga season, away to VfR Aalen on 14 August 2016. He replaced Marc Endres after 80 minutes with his team 2–0 ahead, but the hosts scored two minutes later, and deep into stoppage time, Mbende's headed clearance fell to Gerrit Wegkamp who volleyed it home from distance to secure a draw. Injuries among the regular defenders brought Mbende his first start, away to 1. FC Magdeburg on 22 October, in which he faced one of the league's leading scorers, the equally physical Christian Beck. Mbende had the better of the encounter: Beck scored once, but Chemnitz achieved their first away win of the season, by four goals to two.

Mbende joined SC Cambuur of the Dutch Eerste Divisie (second tier) in May 2018. He left the club at the end of the 2018–19 season.

On 8 August 2019, Mbende signed a two-year contract with Italian Serie C club Catania. He made 23 appearances in all competitions in 2019–20, helping Catania reach the play-offs in which they were eliminated in the second round, but was allowed to leave at the end of the season.

Mbende joined another Serie C club, Viterbese, on 31 August 2020 on a two-year deal. He scored four goals from 28 league matches in his first season, but despite the club president's insistence that Mbende would not leave unless they received an offer they could not refuse, he was released by mutual consent on 25 August, after the 2021–22 season had already begun.

The next day, he signed a multi-year contract with Monterosi Tuscia, newly promoted to Serie C.

International career
Mbende represented Cameroon at youth level. He played for their under-20 team in the 2015 African U-20 Championship qualification process.

Career statistics

References

External links
 

1996 births
Living people
Footballers from Douala
Cameroonian footballers
Association football defenders
Cameroon youth international footballers
Borussia Dortmund players
Birmingham City F.C. players
Chemnitzer FC players
SC Cambuur players
Catania S.S.D. players
U.S. Viterbese 1908 players
Monterosi Tuscia F.C. players
3. Liga players
Eerste Divisie players
Serie C players
Cameroonian expatriate footballers
Cameroonian expatriate sportspeople in Germany
Expatriate footballers in Germany
Cameroonian expatriate sportspeople in England
Expatriate footballers in England
Cameroonian expatriate sportspeople in the Netherlands
Expatriate footballers in the Netherlands
Cameroonian expatriate sportspeople in Italy
Expatriate footballers in Italy